The Royal Concertgebouw is a concert hall in Amsterdam, Netherlands. The Dutch term "concertgebouw" translates into English as "concert building". Its superb acoustics place it among the finest concert halls in the world, along with Boston's Symphony Hall and the Musikverein in Vienna.

In celebration of the building's 125th anniversary, Queen Beatrix bestowed the royal title "Koninklijk" upon the building on 11 April 2013, as she had on the Royal Concertgebouw Orchestra upon its 100th in 1988.

History

Construction began in 1883 in a pasture that was then outside the city, in Nieuwer-Amstel, a municipality that in 1964 became Amstelveen. A total of 2,186 wooden piles, twelve to thirteen metres (40 to 43 ft) long, were emplaced in the soil. The Concertgebouw was completed in late 1886, however due to the difficulties with the municipality of Nieuwer-Amstel – filling in a small canal, paving the access roads and installing street lights – the grand opening of the building was delayed.

The hall opened on 11 April 1888 with an inaugural concert, in which an orchestra of 120 musicians and a chorus of 500 singers participated, performing works of Wagner, Handel, Bach, and Beethoven. The resident orchestra of the Concertgebouw is the Royal Concertgebouw Orchestra (Koninklijk Concertgebouworkest), which gave its first concert in the hall on 3 November 1888, as the Concertgebouw Orchestra (Concertgebouworkest). For many decades from the 1950s to the present day the Netherlands Philharmonic Orchestra (previously the Amsterdam Philharmonic Orchestra) as well as the Radio Filharmonisch Orkest also provide their regular concert series in the Concertgebouw.

On 17 September 1969, British progressive rock band Pink Floyd performed their The Man and The Journey show at Concertgebouw. The show's climax was a rendition of "Celestial Voices" (renamed "The End of the Beginning") in which keyboardist Rick Wright played the hall's organ in place of his Farfisa. The performance was released on CD as part of the band's 2016 box set, The Early Years 1965–1972 in Volume 3: 1969 Dramatis/ation.

Today, some nine hundred concerts and other events per year take place in the Concertgebouw, for a public of over 700,000, making it one of the most-visited concert halls in the world.

, the managing director of the Concertgebouw is Simon Reinink and the artistic director is Anneke Hogenstijn.

Building 
Its reverberation time is 2.8 seconds without audience, 2.2 seconds with, making it ideal for the late Romantic repertoire such as Mahler. Although this characteristic makes it largely unsuited for amplified music, groups such as Led Zeppelin, Pink Floyd and The Who did perform there in the 1960s. In the Main Hall, there is a layer of dust in several places as removing this layer would impact the acoustics as they are now.

A smaller, oval-shaped venue, the Recital Hall (Kleine Zaal), is located behind the Main Hall. Its more intimate space is well-suited for chamber music and Lieder. The Recital Hall has 437 seats.

In 1983, the Concertgebouw was found to be sinking into the damp Amsterdam earth, with several inch-wide cracks appearing in the walls, so the hall embarked on extensive fundraising for renovations. Its difficult emergency restoration started in 1985, during which the 2,186 rotting wooden pilings were replaced with concrete pillars. Dutch architect Pi de Bruijn designed a modern annex for a new entrance and a basement to replace cramped dressing and rehearsal space.

Organ 

The organ was built in 1890 by the organ builder Michael Maarschalkerweerd from Utrecht, and was renovated in the years 1990 to 1993 by the organ builder Flentrop. It has 60 registers on three divisions and pedal.

 Couplers: II/I (also as Suboktavkoppel), III/I, III/II, I/P, II/P, III/P

Names of composers in the Main Hall

In the Main Hall, the surnames of the following 46 composers are displayed on the balcony ledges and on the walls:

In popular culture
The Concertgebouw is mentioned, along with Madison Square Garden, the Hollywood Bowl, and the Rainbow Theatre, in the song "Rock Show" from the 1975 Wings album Venus and Mars.

Belgian singer  mentions the Concertgebouw in his song .

Erroll Garner recorded the live album The Amsterdam Concert in the venue in November 1964.

See also
 History of Amsterdam
 List of concert halls
 List of tourist attractions in Amsterdam

References

External links

Archive of the Concertgebouw at the Amsterdam City Archives

1888 establishments in the Netherlands
Amsterdam-Zuid
Concert halls in Amsterdam
Music venues completed in 1888
Rijksmonuments in Amsterdam
Royal Concertgebouw Orchestra
19th-century architecture in the Netherlands